The Cuban ribbontail catshark (Eridacnis barbouri), is a finback catshark of the family Proscylliidae, found off western central Atlantic Ocean at depths of between 430 and 613 m. It can grow up to a length of 34 cm.

The Cuban ribbontail catshark is ovoviviparous.

References

 

Eridacnis
Ovoviviparous fish
Taxa named by Henry Bryant Bigelow
Taxa named by William Charles Schroeder
Fish described in 1944
Fish of Cuba